is a train station located in Ōmuta, Fukuoka.

Lines 
Nishi-Nippon Railroad
Tenjin Ōmuta Line

Platforms

Adjacent stations

Surrounding area
 Amagi Park
 Amagi Junior High School
 Seishū High School
 Marumiya Store Omuta 
 Ōmutatachibana Post Office
 Shin-Ōmuta Station

Railway stations in Fukuoka Prefecture
Railway stations in Japan opened in 1938